Aegonychon is a genus of flowering plants belonging to the family Boraginaceae.

Its native range is from Europe to Iran, and central China to temperate eastern Asia.

Species:

Aegonychon calabrum 
Aegonychon purpurocaeruleum 
Aegonychon zollingeri

References

Boraginaceae
Boraginaceae genera